The 1993–94 Florida Panthers season was the Panthers' first season. Blockbuster Video magnate H. Wayne Huizenga was awarded an NHL franchise for his native Miami in 1992. The team played at the Miami Arena, and its first major stars were New York Rangers goaltender castoff John Vanbiesbrouck, rookie Rob Niedermayer, and Scott Mellanby, who scored 30 goals during the regular season. The Panthers found themselves one point shy of a playoff spot and missed the 1994 Stanley Cup playoffs.

Regular season

October
The Panthers played their first ever regular season game on October 6, as they recorded a 4-4 tie on the road against the Chicago Blackhawks.  Scott Mellanby scored the first ever Panthers goal, against Ed Belfour.  On October 9, in their third game, the club earned their first victory and shutout, as John Vanbiesbrouck made 36 saves in a 2-0 win over the Tampa Bay Lightning.  On October 12, Florida played their first home game, losing 2-1 to the Pittsburgh Penguins, as Mellanby scored the first goal on home ice.  The Panthers first win at home came on October 14, as they defeated the Ottawa Senators 5-4, as Rob Niedermayer scored the winning goal midway through the third period.  In a game against the Los Angeles Kings on October 19, the Panthers fired 52 shots at Kings goaltender Kelly Hrudey, however, the club had to settle for a 2-2 tie.

After a five-game winless streak, in which Florida posted a 0-3-2 record, the team finished October with two consecutive wins, defeating the New York Islanders 5-2 and the Tampa Bay Lightning 2-1.  Florida finished the month with a 4-5-3 record, good for fifth in the Atlantic Division, and tied for eighth in the Eastern Conference.

November
Florida opened November with two consecutive losses, before heading out for a three-game road trip.  Florida went a perfect 3-0-0 on the road, highlighted by a 3-1 win over the defending Stanley Cup champions, the Montreal Canadiens, as John Vanbiesbrouck led the way with 37 saves.  The Panthers struggled on their five-game homestand, as they went 1-4-0, only earning a victory against the Washington Capitals.  Florida ended the month on a quick two game road trip, losing to the Boston Bruins, then suffered their first ever shutout loss, as they were defeated 4-0 by the Hartford Whalers.

At the end of November, the Panthers had a record of 8-13-3, earning 19 points, and sat in sixth in the Atlantic Division, and 11th in the Eastern Conference.

December
Florida started December with a solid 2-1 overtime victory over the Buffalo Sabres, as Jesse Belanger scored the overtime winner, and John Vanbiesbrouck was solid with 33 saves.  The Panthers then went on a five-game road trip, beginning with a 2-1 loss to the San Jose Sharks on December 5.  On December 7, Florida faced their expansion cousins, the Mighty Ducks of Anaheim, winning the game 3-2.  The next night, the Panthers defeated the Los Angeles Kings 6-5.  They finished their road swing with a 5-2 win over the Winnipeg Jets and a 4-4 tie with the Dallas Stars, going 3-1-1.  Florida finished the month continuing to play good hockey, going 3-1-2 in their remaining six games in December.

By the end of the month, Florida had an overall record of 15-15-6, getting 36 points, sitting in fifth place in the Atlantic Division, and 10th in the Eastern Conference, only one point out of eighth place for the final playoff position.

January
The Panthers began January where they left off in December, earning a 4-2 win over the Mighty Ducks of Anaheim on New Years Day, to move over the .500 level, and into eighth place in the Eastern Conference.  The club then began a six-game road trip, which began with two losses, 3-2 to the New York Rangers, and 4-1 to the New Jersey Devils.  Florida rebounded in the next two games, earning ties against the Boston Bruins and Pittsburgh Penguins.  The team finished the road trip with two wins, defeating the Montreal Canadiens 5-2, and the New York Islanders 2-1, to earn a respectable 2-2-2 record.  Florida continued winning when the returned home, beating the Washington Capitals 5-1 on January 19, followed by an 8-3 blowout victory against the Montreal Canadiens to push their record to 20-17-8.  The club finished January going 1-0-2 in their last three games, as they extended their overall unbeaten streak to nine games.

At the end of January, the Panthers had a 21-17-10 record, earning 52 points, and were in third place in the Atlantic Division, and sixth in the Eastern Conference.

February
The team opened February with two games on the road, and in the first game on February 1, the Panthers unbeaten streak came to an end, as the Pittsburgh Penguins defeated Florida 2-1.  The Panthers rebounded the next night, defeating the Ottawa Senators 4-1, as Rob Niedermayer had two goals, and Mark Fitzpatrick made 32 saves for the win.  The team returned home for two games, as they were blown out 7-2 against the Buffalo Sabres on February 4, however, Florida won their next game, shutting out the Boston Bruins 3-0, with Mark Fitzpatrick making 19 saves.  The Panthers lost their next game in overtime, 4-3 to the Philadelphia Flyers, as Eric Lindros scored the winning goal, however, the team followed up the heart breaking loss with a solid 4-3 win over the New York Islanders.  On February 13, the Panthers defeated the Vancouver Canucks 2-1 to improve to 25-20-10 on the season.

The club then went on another quick two game road trip, where they lost both games, including a 7-3 blowout loss to the Detroit Red Wings.  When returning home, the Red Wings defeated Florida again, this time by a 4-1 score, as the club was on a three-game losing streak.  Florida snapped the losing streak with a 3-2 victory over the Winnipeg Jets, however, the team would lose their last three games of the month to fall back to the .500 level.

At the end of February, Florida had a 26-26-10 record, earning 62 points, which had them in fourth place in the Atlantic Division, and eighth in the Eastern Conference, tied with the Philadelphia Flyers in points, however, Florida had two games in hand.

March
Florida continued to struggle into March, losing their first two games, 3-2 to the New Jersey Devils, and 4-1 to the Hartford Whalers, to push their losing streak to four games, and seven of their last eight games.  On March 7, the team began a three-game road trip to Western Canada, and they put an end to their losing streak as Mark Fitzpatrick made 34 saves in a 2-1 win over the Vancouver Canucks.  In their next game against the Edmonton Oilers, the Panthers won 5-3 to go back to the .500 level.  The club finished the trip with a loss to the Calgary Flames by a 4-2 score.

Florida returned home for a six-game home stand, in which the Panthers went unbeaten, going 3-0-3, which included wins over the New York Rangers, Calgary Flames and Philadelphia Flyers, making their overall season record at 31-29-13.  On March 24, the Panthers nearly overcame a 4-0 deficit, losing 4-3 to the Philadelphia Flyers, to end their unbeaten streak.  The club rebounded in their next game, defeating the New York Islanders 3-1.  The team ended March with two more losses though, losing to the Dallas Stars and St. Louis Blues.

By the end of March, the Panthers had a 32-32-13 record, earning 77 points, which had the club in fourth place in the Atlantic Division, and clinging to eighth in the Eastern Conference for the final playoff position, four points of the ninth place Philadelphia Flyers, and five ahead of the 10th place New York Islanders.

April
The club opened April with a disappointing 2-2 tie against the lowly Ottawa Senators at home before heading out on a three-game road trip.  The Panthers continued to struggle, dropping a 3-2 decision to the New York Rangers.  On April 5, the Panthers blew a 3-1 third period lead against the Quebec Nordiques, and settled for a 3-3 tie, extending their winless streak to five games.  On April 7, Florida overcame a 3-1 deficit, earning a 3-3 tie against the Philadelphia Flyers.  The club returned home for their final three games, and the winless streak continued, as the Panthers tied the New Jersey Devils 2-2, followed by a 5-2 loss to the Quebec Nordiques, pushing their winless streak to eight games, as Florida slipped into ninth place, behind the New York Islanders.  On April 13, the Panthers were officially eliminated from the post-season, as the Islanders defeated the Tampa Bay Lightning to clinch the eighth and final playoff position.  The Panthers played their final game of the season on April 14, defeating the Islanders 4-1.

The Panthers finished the 1993-94 season with a 33-34-17 record, earning 83 points, which was an NHL record for points by an expansion team until the Vegas Golden Knights surpassed it in their first season. Florida finished the season in fifth place in the Atlantic Division, and ninth in the Eastern Conference, just one point of a playoff position.

Season standings

Schedule and results

Player statistics

Forwards
Note: GP = Games played; G = Goals; A = Assists; Pts = Points; PIM = Penalty minutes

Defensemen
Note: GP = Games played; G = Goals; A = Assists; Pts = Points; PIM = Penalty minutes

Goaltending
Note: GP = Games played; W = Wins; L = Losses; T = Ties; SV% = Save percentage ; GAA = Goals against average; SO = Shutouts

Awards and records
 John Vanbiesbrouck, Goaltender, NHL Second Team All-Star

Transactions

Trades
Trades listed are from June 1, 1993 to June 1, 1994.

Free agents

Signings

Retirement

Draft picks

Expansion Draft

Notes
 Lost in Expansion Draft phase two to the Tampa Bay Lightning.

NHL Draft

Notes
 The Panthers acquired these picks as the result of a trade on June 26, 1993 that sent a second-round pick in 1993 (31st overall) to Winnipeg in exchange for these picks.
 The Panthers acquired this pick as the result of a trade on June 25, 1993 that agreed that Florida selected Darren Puppa in the 1993 NHL Expansion Draft to Tampa Bay in exchange for this pick.
Tampa Bay previously acquired this pick as the result of a trade on March 22, 1993 that sent Peter Taglianetti to Pittsburgh in exchange for this pick.
 The Panthers second-round pick went to the Winnipeg Jets as the result of a trade on June 26, 1993 that sent a second and third-round pick both in 1993 (41st and 67th overall) to Florida in exchange for this pick (31st overall).

References
 Panthers on Hockey Database

F
F
Florida Panthers seasons
Florida Panthers
Florida Panthers